Arjen Klaas Lenstra (born 2 March 1956, in Groningen) is a Dutch mathematician, cryptographer and computational number theorist. He is currently a professor at the École Polytechnique Fédérale de Lausanne (EPFL) where he heads of the Laboratory for Cryptologic Algorithms.

Career 
He studied mathematics at the University of Amsterdam. He is currently a professor at the EPFL (Lausanne), in the Laboratory for Cryptologic Algorithms, and previously worked for Citibank and Bell Labs.

Research 
Lenstra is active in cryptography and computational number theory, especially in areas such as integer factorization. With Mark Manasse, he was the first to seek volunteers over the internet for a large scale volunteer computing project.  Such projects became more common after the Factorization of RSA-129 which was a high publicity distributed factoring success led by Lenstra along with Derek Atkins, Michael Graff and Paul Leyland.  He was also a leader in the successful factorizations of several other RSA numbers.  

Lenstra was also involved in the development of the number field sieve.  With coauthors, he showed the great potential of the algorithm early on by using it to factor the ninth Fermat number, which was far out of reach by other factoring algorithms of the time.  He has since been involved with several other number field sieve factorizations including the current record, RSA-768.

Lenstra's most widely cited scientific result is the first polynomial time algorithm to factor polynomials with rational coefficients in the seminal paper that introduced the LLL lattice reduction algorithm with Hendrik Willem Lenstra and László Lovász.  

Lenstra is also co-inventor of the XTR cryptosystem.

On 1 March 2005, Arjen Lenstra, Xiaoyun Wang, and Benne de Weger of Eindhoven University of Technology demonstrated construction of two X.509 certificates with different public keys and the same MD5 hash, a demonstrably practical hash collision. The construction included private keys for both public keys.

Distinctions
Lenstra is the recipient of the RSA Award for Excellence in Mathematics 2008 Award.

Private life
Lenstra's brother and co-author Hendrik Lenstra is a professor in mathematics at Leiden University and his brother Jan Karel Lenstra is a former director of Centrum Wiskunde & Informatica (CWI).

See also
L-notation
General number field sieve
Schnorr–Seysen–Lenstra algorithm

References

External links

Web page on Arjen Lenstra at EPFL

1956 births
Living people
Dutch mathematicians
Modern cryptographers
Scientists from Groningen (city)
Academic staff of the École Polytechnique Fédérale de Lausanne
International Association for Cryptologic Research fellows
Number theorists